Yun Il-seon (October 5, 1896 – June 22, 1987) was a South Korean politician, pathologist, and anatomist. He was the 6th Chairman of University of Seoul 1956 to 1961, a pathology pupil of Fuzinami Ahkira (藤浪鑑), successor of Rudolf Virchow, and cousin of president Yun Bo-seon. A nickname was Dongho (동호;東湖).

Life 
Yun was an early modern pathologist and anatomist of Korea. Yun majored in pathology in Japan during the 1920s, and then returned to Korea to become an assistant professor at Keijo Imperial University. At Keijo Imperial University and Severance Medical College, he took the lead in the introduction and development of pathology and also basic medicine, through publications of experimental research and education.

After Korea's liberation from Japanese colonization in 1945, Yun contributed to South Korea pathology and anatomy education. He was vice chancellor of Seoul National University until 1954 and in 1956, and subsequently served as sixth chancellor of the university until 1960.

References

External links 
 윤일선 : 한국과학기술인 명예의 전당 
 Yun Il-seon 
 Yun Il-seon 
 윤일선:서울대학교 총장 
 

1896 births
1987 deaths
Korean educators
South Korean anti-communists
Yun Chi-ho
South Korean politicians
Kyoto University alumni
People from Tokyo
Academic staff of Seoul National University
South Korean anatomists
Presidents of Seoul National University
Members of the National Academy of Sciences of the Republic of Korea